Mitrofani is a commune located in Vâlcea County, Oltenia, Romania. It is composed of four villages: Mitrofani, Cetățeaua, Izvorașu and Racu. These were part of Sutești Commune until 2004, when they were split off to form a separate commune.

References

Communes in Vâlcea County
Localities in Oltenia